Dropdead is an American hardcore punk band based in Providence, Rhode Island. They have been active in the punk scene since 1991, having been formed in January of that year. The band's songs are generally short and very fast-paced, with few lasting longer than two minutes. Other famous crust punk and grindcore bands like Nasum have covered some of their songs.  The band has a strong do-it-yourself ethic.

History 
Meeting in Providence in 1989, they started playing as Hellocaust. After reconfiguring the lineup, a name change, and a great increase in speed and intensity, Dropdead was officially formed in January 1991. The first show happened in April 1991 with Born Against and Rorschach.

Recorded with Kurt Ballou at GodCity Studio, their follow up to their 1998 Untitled album titled Dropdead 2020 was released on September 25, 2020.

Influences 
They have cited various acts where they have drawn musically from: Anti Cimex, Crass,  Conflict, Confuse, Discharge, Gauze, Icons of Filth, Infest, Lärm, Merzbow, Mob 47, Pandemonium, S.O.B., Septic Death, Siege (whose 1984 demo tape Drop Dead is the origin of the band's name), SSD, and Swans.

Members 

Current
 Bob Otis – vocals (1991–present)
 Ben Barnett – guitar (1991–present)
 Brian Mastrobuono – drums (1991–present)
 George Radford – bass (2010–present)

Former
 Lee Mastrobuono – bass (1991–1996)
 Devon Cahill – bass (1996–2010)

Timeline

Discography
Studio albums
 Dropdead (1993, Selfless) (Sometimes referred to as 落とす死 or Dropdead 1993)
 Untitled (1998, Armageddon) (Sometimes referred to as LP 2 or Dropdead 1998)
 Dropdead 2020 (2020, Armageddon)

EPs
 Untitled 7" (1992, Crust Records)
 Hostile 7" (1996, Spiral Objective/Insurgence)
 Arms Race EP (2018, Armageddon)

Splits
 Dropdead/Swirlies (1991, Fast Forward)
 Dropdead/Rupture 8" (1992, Highly Collectable Records)
 Dropdead/Crossed Out 5" (1993, co-released by five labels)
 Dropdead/Totalitär 7" (2002, Prank)
 Dropdead/Unholy Grave 7" (2003, MCR)
 Dropdead/Look Back and Laugh 7" (2004, Armageddon)
 Converge/Dropdead 7" (2011, self-released)
 Dropdead/Ruidosa Inmundicia 7" (2013, Armageddon)
 Dropdead/Systematic Death – Fighting For Life 7" (2013, Armageddon)
 Dropdead/Brainoil 7" (2014, Armageddon)

Other
 Demo 1991 (1991, Armageddon, Fast Forward)
 What Could Be Single lathe 6" (2014, Armageddon; recorded live on BSR 88.1 FM on February 5, 2004)
 Demo 2019 (2019, Armageddon; benefit release for the Dropdead van fund)

Compilation albums
 Discography 1991–1993 (1994, Armageddon)

Live albums
 Untitled (1991, self-released; recorded live at 2nd show)
 Untitled (1991, self-released; recorded live on WRIU Radio 90.3 FM on May 22, 1991)
 Live at The Jame Room (1996, HG Fact Co. in Japan; recorded in Columbia, SC on August 10, 1993)
 Stack/Dropdead – Live In Udine 1996 (1997, self-released; recorded in Udine, Italy on October 2, 1996)
 Drop On – The Bootleg 3" (1997, Profane Existence Far East; recorded at Bad Lands, Hitoshima, Japan on May 14, 1996)
 Dropdead/Mrtvá Budoucnost/Primitiv Bunko - The Big Boss Originall Soundtrack (1998, Hogo Fogo Records; recorded live at 007 Club in Praha, Czech Republic on October 29, 1998)
 Live In Železniki (1998, Podpajsho Rekords; recorded in Železniki, Slovenia on November 1, 1998)
 Humanity Is Burying the Earth with Its Rotting Carcasses (1999, Ad Absurdum Records; recorded in Lahti, Finland on October 19, 1997)
 Live AJZ Wermelskirchen (2003, Red C Records, Armageddon; recorded in AJZ.Bahndamm Wermelskirchen, Germany in December 1998)

Associated Acts 
Bob Otis
 Previously: The Fuzz, Lolita Black, Extinction Machine, NRK and I, Destroyer

Ben Barnett
 Runs Armageddon Label and Armageddon Record Shop
 Previously: Snake Apartment, Generica

Brian Mastrobuono
 Previously: Straight to Hell, Supperating Pustule, Battlesnake, Neon Bitches, and Ratstab
 Currently: Wolfhex

George Radford
 Currently: Edict, She Rides
 Previously: Intent to Injure, Fucking Invincible, and Sweet Jesus

Devon Cahill
 Previously: Monster X, Exploding Corpse Action, Conniption, and Hail Mary

See also 
Animal rights and punk subculture

References

External links
Bandcamp page
Dropdead on Discogs
Providence Attacks
Dropdead live set in Tijuana, Mexico

Hardcore punk groups from Rhode Island
American grindcore musical groups
American crust and d-beat groups
Musical groups established in 1991
Powerviolence groups
1991 establishments in Rhode Island